Salvatore Nunnari (born 11 June 1939, in Reggio Calabria) is the Archbishop Emeritus of Cosenza-Bisignano.

Biography
Nunnari was born 11 June 1939 in Reggio, Reggio Calabria, Calabria, Italy.  He was ordained priest on 12 July 1964. He was appointed Archbishop on 30 January 1999 to the Archdiocese of Sant’Angelo dei Lombardi-Conza-Nusco-Bisaccia. He thus received his episcopal consecration on 20 March 1999 from Archbishop Luigi Vittorio Mondello.  He was appointed Metropolitan Archbishop of Cosenza-Bisignano on 18 December 2004 replacing Giuseppe Agostino.

With the retirement of Bishop Ercole Lupinacci, he was appointed as Apostolic Administrator for the Eparchy of Lungro of the Italo-Albanian Catholic Church on 10 August 2010.

He took retirement on 15 March 2015.

References

External links
  Official Site of the Archdiocese of Cosenza-Bisignano
  Catholic Hierarchy Profile

Roman Catholic archbishops of Cosenza-Bisignano
1939 births
Living people
People from Reggio Calabria
Archbishops of Sant'Angelo dei Lombardi-Conza-Nusco-Bisaccia